Maskiot (lit. Artful Bowls) is an Israeli settlement in the West Bank. Located in the northern Jordan Valley, it falls under the jurisdiction of Bik'at HaYarden Regional Council.

The international community considers Israeli settlements in the West Bank illegal under international law, but the Israeli government disputes this.

History
It was founded as a Nahal settlement in 1986 and was named after the Bible (Proverbs 25:11): "A word aptly spoken is like apples of gold in artful bowls."

In July 2008 it was reportedly close to being expanded. According to Israeli Radio, the expansion was part of a deal between settlers in Israeli Outposts established without the permission of the Israeli Government and the Israeli Defense Ministry. Many of Maskiot's residents are planned to be settlers previously evicted from Gush Katif in the Gaza Strip as part of the Israeli disengagement from Gaza. Twenty housing units will be built for evacuees of Shirat HaYam. UN Secretary General Ban Ki-moon said he was "deeply concerned" over the new Maskiot plan, whereas the British government said it was "dismayed". A spokesman for US Secretary of State Condoleezza Rice said that the settlement expansion was "not helpful", and "inconsistent with Israel's commitment to the roadmap".

References

Israeli settlements in the West Bank
Nahal settlements
Community settlements
1986 establishments in the Palestinian territories
Populated places established in 1986